Julio Sánchez Gardel (15 December 1879 in Catamarca- 18 March 1937 in Buenos Aires) was an Argentine dramatist and writer.

Works

 Almas grandes (1904)
 Ley humana (1904)
 En el abismo (1905)
 La garza (1906)
 Cara o cruz (1907)
 Noche de luna (1907), dedicated to his mother
 Las dos fuerzas or Amor de otoño (1907)
 Botón de rosa (1907)
 Los ojos del ciego (1908)
 Las campanas (1908)
 Frente al llano (1909)
 La otra (1910)
 Después de misa (1910)
 Los mirasoles (1911)
 La montaña de las brujas (1912)
 Sol de invierno (1914)
 La vendimia (1915)
 El zonda (1915)
 La llegada del batallón (1916)
 Los cuenteros (1917)
 El príncipe heredero (1918)
 Perdonemos (1923)
 El dueño del pueblo (1925)
 Las quita penas (1927)
 El cascabel del duende (1930)

References

Argentine dramatists and playwrights
1879 births
1937 deaths
People from Catamarca Province
Male dramatists and playwrights
20th-century Argentine writers
20th-century Argentine male writers
20th-century dramatists and playwrights